Nathalie ("Natalina") Lupino (born 13 June 1963 in Valenciennes, Nord) is a retired female judoka from France. She claimed the bronze medal in the Women's Heavyweight (+ 72 kg) division at the 1992 Summer Olympics in Barcelona, Spain. In the bronze medal match she defeated Germany's Claudia Weber.

References

External links
 

1963 births
Living people
Sportspeople from Valenciennes
French female judoka
Judoka at the 1992 Summer Olympics
Olympic judoka of France
Olympic bronze medalists for France
Olympic medalists in judo
Medalists at the 1992 Summer Olympics